Locatello is a comune (municipality) in the Province of Bergamo in the Italian region of Lombardy, located about  northeast of Milan and about  northwest of Bergamo.

Locatello borders the following municipalities: Brumano, Corna Imagna, Fuipiano Valle Imagna, Rota d'Imagna.

The name of this village comes from the family name : "Locatelli", a noble Italian family. The family " Locatelli " is on the base a single family which, later a millennium divided at the four corners of the world.

Demographic evolution

References